Gheorghe Visu (born 2 July 1951) is a Romanian actor. He appeared in more than forty films since 1974.

In 2006 and 2007 the actor was chosen by Walt Disney Pictures to provide the Romanian voice of Bagheera in the animated movies The Jungle Book and The Jungle Book 2.

Selected filmography

References

External links 

1951 births
Living people
Romanian male film actors